Henry Latimer (April 24, 1752 – December 19, 1819) was an American physician and politician from Newport, Delaware. He was elected to the Continental Congress from Delaware, and was a member of the Federalist Party, who served in the Delaware General Assembly, as U.S. Representative from Delaware, and U.S. Senator from Delaware.

Early life and family
Latimer was born in Newport in the Delaware Colony, son of James Latimer, Sr. and Sarah Geddes. His father was a wealthy grain shipper and politician, who was a member of the House of Assembly in the 1778/79 session and a member of the Delaware convention that ratified the U.S. Constitution on December 7, 1787. Latimer's brother, George, also served in the House of Assembly from the 1779/80 session through the 1781/82 session. Later he moved to Philadelphia where he became Speaker of the Pennsylvania House of Representatives in 1794.

Latimer studied medicine, and attended the College of Philadelphia (now the University of Pennsylvania) in Philadelphia and graduated in 1773, going to University of Edinburgh Medical School in Scotland in 1775 to complete his education. Returning in the midst of the American Revolution, he served in the "Flying Hospital," a mobile surgical unit of the Continental Army. He was at the Battle of Brandywine and continued through the end of the war. After the war he was an original member of the Society of the Cincinnati.

Professional and political career
Elected to the Continental Congress on April 8, 1784, Latimer never attended the session that spring in Annapolis, Maryland and was replaced. Like his father and brother, he was elected to the House of Assembly and served from the 1787/88 session through the 1790/91 session. He was the Speaker in that last session.

Latimer lost the 1792 election for the U.S. House to Major John Patten by thirty votes, but contested Patton's election to the U.S. House. The Federalist majority there reviewed the ballots cast, and based on a confusing law requiring the names of two candidates on the ballot, disqualified enough of Patton's votes to award the seat to Latimer. Amidst considerable bitterness, he was seated February 14, 1794. After once again losing an election to Patten in 1794, Latimer resigned from the U.S. House on February 7, 1795 when he was elected by the Delaware General Assembly to the disputed and long vacant U.S. Senate seat of retired U.S. Senator George Read. After finishing Read's term, he was reelected in 1796, and served until February 28, 1801, when he also resigned. Some believe that the reason for his resignation was that he was unhappy over the tactics of his political opponents who were still bitter over the circumstances of the contested election in 1792.

At various times Latimer was a member of the Wilmington Academy board, director of the Bank of Delaware, president of the First Agricultural Society of New Castle County, and president of the Board of Trustees of Newark College. He was a charter member of the Delaware Medical Society.

Death and legacy

Latimer died at Philadelphia and was buried first in the Presbyterian Cemetery in Wilmington. This cemetery is now the location of the Wilmington Institute Library and his remains were then moved to the Wilmington and Brandywine Cemetery.

Even though he was a physician and a Presbyterian, Latimer was a member of a prominent and well-to-do merchant family and was very much in agreement with the prevailing Federalist positions on such controversial issues as the Jay Treaty and other measures of the Adams administration. The burgeoning party of Thomas Jefferson, now known as the Democratic-Republicans, was increasingly popular and vocal in heavily Irish and "Country Party" New Castle County, and they never seemed to forgive him his apparent theft of the 1792 congressional election.  Consequently, upon celebrating election victories in 1802, they fired cannon, loaded with potatoes and herring, in mock salute to Latimer, remembering his reputed statement that "the laboring classes lived too well to be happy and should be reduced to the fare of the Irish."

Almanac
Elections were held October 1. Members of the General Assembly took office on October 20 or the following weekday. The State Assemblymen were elected for a one-year term. They chose the Continental Congressmen for a one-year term. U.S. Representatives took office March 4 and have a two-year term.

The General Assembly chose the U.S. Senators, who also took office March 4, but for a six-year term. In this case he was initially completing the existing term, the vacancy caused by the resignation of George Read. However, the General Assembly failed to fill the position for nearly a year and a half.

After 1792 elections were moved to the first Tuesday of October and members of the General Assembly took office on the first Tuesday of January. The State Legislative Council was renamed the State Senate and the State House of Assembly was renamed the State House of Representatives.

Notes

References

Images
United States Senate ; Portrait courtesy of the United States Senate, Art & History.

External links
Biographical Directory of the United States Congress
Delaware's Members of Congress
The Political Graveyard
 Society of the Cincinnati
 American Revolution Institute

Places with more information
Delaware Historical Society; website; 505 North Market Street, Wilmington, Delaware 19801; (302) 655-7161
University of Delaware; Library website; 181 South College Avenue, Newark, Delaware 19717; (302) 831-2965

1752 births
1819 deaths
People from Newport, Delaware
People of colonial Delaware
American Presbyterians
Pro-Administration Party members of the United States House of Representatives from Delaware
Pro-Administration Party United States senators from Delaware
Delaware Federalists
Federalist Party United States senators from Delaware
Members of the Delaware House of Representatives
Speakers of the Delaware House of Representatives
Physicians from Delaware
University of Pennsylvania alumni
Alumni of the University of Edinburgh
Physicians in the American Revolution
Burials at Wilmington and Brandywine Cemetery
Members of the United States House of Representatives from Delaware